Titanokorys is a genus of extinct hurdiid radiodont (a grouping of primitive stem arthropods which lived during the early Paleozoic) that existed during the mid Cambrian. It bears a resemblance to the related genus Cambroraster. Fossils of T. gainesi were first found within Marble Canyon in 2018. The fossils were not named until 2021 because they were assumed to be giant specimens of Cambroraster.

The creature was one of several genera of radiodonts known from the Burgess Shale, with some of the others being Cambroraster, Anomalocaris, Peytoia, and Hurdia. Titanokorys is distinguished from other Burgess Shale radiodonts because of its large anterior sclerite (head covering carapace) and a pair of spines on the anteroventral sides. Based on the shape of its appendages, Titanokorys is speculated to have used them to sift through the sand looking for prey. It is believed to have fed by using its anterior sclerite to scoop up organisms from the sea floor. Then it would use its frontal appendages (long grasping structures that all radiodonts possessed) to trap the prey item so it could start consuming it. Because of its size, Titanokorys was one of the dominant predators of the Burgess Shale and one of the largest animals in its ecosystem.

Etymology and history of research
The genus name refers to the Titans of Greek mythology in combination with the ancient Greek κόρυς (korys = "helmet") and alludes to the unusual size of the central carapace element. The species name "gainesi" honors the American geologist Robert R. Gaines, who was instrumental in the discovery of new fossil deposits in the Burgess Shale in 2012.

The first description of the genus and type species was made in 2021 by Jean-Bernard Caron and Joseph Moysiuk. This study was based on twelve specimens that came from the Marble Canyon area of Tokumm Creek in the northern part of Kootenay National Park in British Columbia. All previously known specimens are kept at the Royal Ontario Museum (ROM) in the Department of Invertebrate Paleontology (ROMIP). Before the animal was named, researchers often nicknamed it the "mothership" or "spaceship" in reference to its massive head looking like a starcraft.

Description
Fossils of Titanokorys are known from the Burgess Shale, a famous Lagerstätte from British Columbia dating to around 508 million years ago. Only disarticulated head sclerites, frontal appendages and oral cone (radiodont mouthpart that somewhat resembled a camera aperture) had been discovered. Due to the limited discovery, little is known about the oral cone of Titanokorys, but the tooth plates have smooth surfaces like most other hurdiids. Titanokorys is readily dintinguised from other radiodonts by the anterior sclerite (H-element) with trifurcate anterior region and lateral sclerites. The frontal appendages are almost indistinguishable from those of Cambroraster. Which have short podomeres with 5 long endites, each associated with a row of long, densely-packed auxiliary spines. These appendages suggest a specialized “sweep feeding” behaviour that would allow the radiodont to catch and eat both microscopic and macroscopic food. Titanokorys lived alongside other Burgess Shale radiodonts, such as Anomalocaris, Hurdia, and Peytoia. The fact that so many large predatory radiodonts lived together suggests that Cambrian communities at the time were very diverse and could hold many large macro-predators.

Comparison to Cambroraster 

Living alongside Titanokorys was a similar-looking hurdiid radiodont called Cambroraster. This closely related genus is so similar to Titanokorys that the latter was originally thought to have been a giant specimen of the former genus and not a distinct genus. On the other hand, Titanokorys had a more pointed, larger head sclerite which reached  in length. The grasping appendages of the two genera are almost identical, though the secondary spines on the appendages of Titanokorys are longer than, and possibly not terminally hooked, as the ones seen in Cambroraster.

Classification 

Titanokorys is a radiodont belonging to the family Hurdiidae. Hurdiids can be distinguished from other radiodonts by the rake-like frontal appendages which each bore a single row of elongated endites with only anterior auxiliary spines, alongside the combination of enlarged head sclerites and tetraradial mouthparts (oral cone). Titanokorys was found to form a derived clade with Cordaticaris, Cambroraster and possibly also Zhenghecaris. While Stanleycaris and Schinderhannes were found as the most basal hurdiids.

Ecology
Like many other hurdiid radiodonts, Titanokorys was most likely a nektobenthic animal that swam slowly above the seabed and sifted through sediments. It is presumed that the animal dug up the sediment with its huge protruding carapace and guided the prey into its mouth with the front appendages to form a cage-like structure. Since fossils may be preserved together alongside Cambroraster, it is presumed that Titanokorys lived in the same areas as Cambroraster. Titanokorys is a relatively rare find at Marble Canyon, because of this it is thought that this fossil site possibly occurred near the edge of the species range in life.

Based on differences in size, Titanokorys probably escaped competition with Cambroraster by hunting larger prey, thereby exploiting a different ecological niches. Aside from Cambroraster, other creatures lived alongside T. gainesi. The fauna in the region included the hymenocarine pancrustaceans such as Tokummia and Balhuticaris, the primitive chordate Metaspriggina, and the isoxid arthropod Surusicaris. Like all stem and total group arthropods, Titanokorys had to shed its outer skin to grow larger. This is evidenced by the holotype specimen (ROMIP 65415) which probably represents a collection of molted remains. Sometimes, fossils of these exuvia are found alongside numerous specimens of the agnostid Trilobite genus Peronopsis in the immediate vicinity or directly on the exuvia. Why the trilobites were on the exuvia is unclear, but they could have been eating from the molting residues or grazed on a possible biofilm that was growing on it.

References

Anomalocaridids
Articles containing video clips
Prehistoric arthropod genera
Burgess Shale fossils
Cambrian arthropods
Cambrian genus extinctions